Lepidogma atomalis is a species of snout moth in the genus Lepidogma. It was described by Hugo Theodor Christoph in 1887 and is known from Turkey.

References

Moths described in 1887
Epipaschiinae
Endemic fauna of Turkey